Mi Mejor Regalo (My Best Gift) is the title of a studio album released by Colombian performer Charlie Zaa and produced by Sergio George. This album is a tribute to Mexican singer-songwriter Joan Sebastian who died four months prior to the release of the album. According to Zaa, the concept of the album began a year before Sebastian's death. The album's first single, "Un Idiota", reached number one on the Tropical Songs chart while the album also reached number on the Tropical Albums chart.

Track listing

Charts

Year-end charts

See also
 List of number-one Billboard Tropical Albums from the 2010s

References

2015 albums
Charlie Zaa albums
Spanish-language albums
Tribute albums